Ben Hatke (born June 4, 1977, in Lafayette, Indiana) is an American cartoonist and children's book illustrator. He is most well known for his series of middle grade graphic novels Zita the Spacegirl. His work is notable for its focus on strong female characters.

Biography 
Hatke was born in Lafayette, Indiana, and grew up with sisters. His family were members of the Society for Creative Anachronism, and Hatke spent a lot of time outdoors as a child.

One of his early comics influences was Wendy and Richard Pini's Elfquest. Other influences included Bill Watterson, Maurice Sendak, Leonardo da Vinci, Brian Froud, Trina Schart Hyman, Barry Windsor-Smith, and Todd McFarlane.

Hatke attended Christendom College, in the Shenandoah Valley, earning his B.A. in 2000. While he was in college, he spent a semester in Italy studying Italian Renaissance painting.

Career 
Hatke contributed the story "The Plank" to the anthology Flight vol. 2, published by Image Comics in 2005. His story "The Edge" appeared in Flight #3, published (at that point by Random House) in 2006.

His character Mighty Jack is a contemporary spin on the fairy tale of Jack and the Beanstalk.

Zita the Spacegirl 
According to The Hollywood Reporter, Zita the Spacegirl, "centers on a girl named Zita who embarks on a journey to becoming an intergalactic hero after her friend is abducted by an alien doomsday cult. Along the way, she rides a giant mouse, deals with humanoid chickens as well as robots, and makes friends with a blob-like creature."

According to Hatke, the character was actually created by his wife Anna while she was still in high school. When Hatke and Anna met in college, he began adapting the character into its present incarnation.

He continued developing the character in webcomics and then a short story titled "Zita the Spacegirl: If Wishes Were Socks," in the 2008 Random House anthology Flight Explorer.

Zita the Spacegirl debuted in 2011 with First Second Books. The second and third volumes appeared in 2012 and 2014.

In 2016, it was announced that Fox Animation had picked up movie right for the Zita trilogy; the films will be produced by Chernin Entertainment.

Personal life 
Hatke lives in Front Royal, Virginia, with his wife Anna and their five daughters. In September, 2019 their then youngest daughter Ida died in a horse-related accident.  They had another daughter two years later.  He is an avid player of role-playing games, as well as a practitioner of archery. He is also a fire-eater and amateur tumbler.

Awards 
 2011 Cybils Award — Zita the Spacegirl
 2016 Eisner Award for Best Publication for Early Readers (up to age 8) — Little Robot

Bibliography

Graphic novels 
 2011 Zita the Spacegirl (First Second) 
 2012 Legends of Zita the Spacegirl (First Second) 
 2014 The Return of Zita the Spacegirl (First Second) 
 2015 Little Robot (First Second) 
 2016 Mighty Jack (First Second) 
 2017 Mighty Jack and the Goblin King (First Second) 
 2018 The Zita Trilogy Boxed Set (First Second) 
 2019 Mighty Jack and Zita the Spacegirl (First Second)

Children's books 
 2014 Julia’s House for Lost Creatures (First Second) 
 2016 Nobody Likes a Goblin (First Second) 
 2016 (by Ann M. Martin and Annie Parnell) Missy Piggle-Wiggle and the Whatever Cure
 2017 (by Ann M. Martin and Annie Parnell) Missy Piggle-Wiggle and the Won't-Walk-the-Dog Cure
 2018 (by Ann M. Martin and Annie Parnell) Missy Piggle-Wiggle and the Sticky-Fingers Cure
 2020 Julia’s House Moves On (First Second) 
2021 Julia's House Goes Home (First Second), ISBN 978-1250769329

References

External links 
 
 Zita the Space Girl website

1977 births
Artists from Indiana
Artists from Virginia
American cartoonists
American children's book illustrators
American graphic novelists
Living people
People from Front Royal, Virginia